Joan Liffring-Zug Bourret (February 20, 1929 - October 16, 2022) was an American photographer, book publisher, and civil rights activist.  On April 6, 1951, she became the first woman to photograph herself giving birth. She contributed more than 500,000 negatives from the 1940s to 2007 to the archives of the State Historical Society of Iowa and has been called Iowa's premier documentary photographer of the 20th century. In 1996 she was inducted into the Iowa Women's Hall of Fame.  She founded Penfield Books in 1979.  Penfield Books has published more than 110 titles. Bourret's autobiography, Pictures and People: A Search for Visual Truth and Social Justice was awarded the Benjamin Franklin Award by the Independent Book Publishers Association in the category of Autobiographies/Memoirs in 2012.

References

External links

1929 births
2022 deaths
American women photographers
People from Iowa City, Iowa
American civil rights activists
American book publishers (people)
Documentary photographers
21st-century American women
Women photojournalists